Asaba is the capital city of Delta State, Nigeria. It is located at the western bank of the Niger River, in the Oshimili South Local Government Area. Asaba had a population of 149,603 as at the 2006 census, and a metropolitan population of over half a million people.

Asaba is well known for social activities and amenities such as hotels, clubs, cinemas, malls, event centre, etc. It holds a yearly program named Delta Yaddah which always hosts a series of gospel singers among others. Due to its large population, the crime rate is high. Pickpocketing, robbery, etc., are rampant. Because of the presence of foreigners in the state, the cost of living is high in Asaba. The Onitsha bridge is the boundary between Delta and Anambra state, as the bridge separates Asaba and Onitsha.

Etymology
Asaba is from the exclamation Ahabam, meaning "I have chosen well", a quote from the Nnebisi, the founding father of Asaba.

History
The city of Asaba was once the colonial capital of the Southern Nigeria Protectorate. It was founded in 1884. Between 1886 and 1900, it hosted the Royal Niger Company, which the British authorities set up to stimulate trade and the exportation of goods to England. That company has grown today into UAC Nigeria PLC. Scottish explorer William B. Balkie, when signing a trade treaty with Igbo chief Ezebogo in Asaba on 30 August 1885, remarked "After our salutations, I spoke of friendship, of trade, and of education, and particularly enlarged upon the evils of war, and the benefits of peace, all of which was well received".

Owing to Asaba's influential history and geography, and current strategic political and economic influence in Nigeria, Asaba is generally known as the regional capital of the Anioma area. The clamor for creation of Anioma state has been going on for decades.

Geography
Asaba is situated on a terrace of the lower Niger River, overlooking the point where the Anambra River flows into it. Beyond the river banks, on the high plains which are far more extensive than the river basins, secondary forest vegetation flourishes. The historic Niger River is a trans-African link beginning from West Africa and down into the Atlantic Ocean. Asaba forms a connector between western, eastern and northern Nigeria through the Niger River from the north and via the Asaba Niger Bridge, an east–west link and a Nigerian landmark.

The greater Asaba occupies an area of about 300 square kilometers. It maintains an average tropical temperature of 32 °C during the dry season and an average fertile rainfall of  during the rainy season.

Greater Asaba includes some of the other neighboring communities such as Igbuzo, Okpanam, Oko, Okwe and Ugbolu on the western section of the Niger River.

Culture
Asaba is culturally led by the highly revered Asagba of Asaba, to whom the leaders (individually referred to as the “Diokpa”) of each of the five settlement quarters (locally identified as Ebos) report directly on matters affecting the community. The Asagba is assisted by the Iyasele of Asaba [Iyase] who is the customary Prime Minister as well as a council of chiefs and elders [Olinzele, Otu Ihaza, Oloto, etc.]

Demographics

Igbo people constitute 63% of the total population of Asaba.

Since becoming the administrative capital of Delta State, Asaba has grown in population to over half a million people. Today, it maintains a cosmopolitan population representative of the diverse cultures in Delta State and across Nigeria.

Economy
Asaba is an administrative area and seat of government established during the time of the Royal Niger Company (now UACN), and is the administrative capital of Delta state. Thus civil service leads the economy and economic activities of the city's inhabitants. The Nigerian government through the administration of Samuel Ogbemudia established the Asaba Textile Mills and a power substation at Asaba. The city of Asaba hosts some pharmaceutical companies that manufacture medicines and there is also a steel mill within the city. Tourism also attracts revenue into the city, which has resulted to a booming hospitality business.

Markets
There are three major markets in Asaba: Ogbe-Ogonogo Market, Cable Point Market,Infant Jesus Market, Iyanga Market and Wazobia Commodity Market

Sport

The Stephen Keshi Stadium at Asaba, which had a face-lift to satisfy local fans, has hosted several international competitions and soccer events since it was upgraded by the administration of Senator Dr. Ifeanyi Arthur Okowa and commissioned by Nigeria's former president Olusegun Obasanjo. The stadium is the home of Delta Force FC.

Transport

Air
The city of Asaba and neighboring cities are accessible by air through the Asaba International Airport.

Road

The Asaba-Benin express road is an important road which connects parts of eastern Nigeria with western Nigeria. There is also a road that connects areas of Asaba with Ughelli, while the Asaba-Ebu road connects the city with northern Nigeria.

Water
Asaba is served by water transportation available through the Niger River, which surrounds most parts of the African city.

Notable people

Phillip Asiodu
Epiphany Azinge
Maryam Babangida
Joseph Chike Edozien
Lynxxx
Frank Nwachukwu Ndili
Ike Nwamu
Emma Nyra
Chief Dennis Osadebay
SHiiKANE

Gallery

See also
Abraka
Asaba-Asa
Asaba massacre
Ekumeku Movement
Warri
Uvwie

References

External links
Asaba.com
Asaba.net
Asaba Association Non-profit Group
Asaba Development Association in the United Kingdom
Asaba Portal
Asaba History and Culture Collaboration Research Platform

State capitals in Nigeria
 
Cities in Delta State
1884 establishments in the British Empire